SAPIA (South African Petroleum Industry Association) was formed in July 1994 by six of South Africa's leading petroleum refining  and marketing companies namely: 

 BP (SA) (PTY) LTD
 Caltex Oil (SA) (PTY) LTD
 Engen Petroleum LTD
 Shell (SA) (PTY) LTD
 Sasol Limited
 Total (SA) (PTY) LTD
 Zenex Oil (PTY) LTD (No longer a member)

The stated goal of the organisation is to represent the interests of the petroleum refining and marketing industry in South Africa. The organisation's aim is to ensure that all interested parties clearly understand the contribution that this industry makes to the economic and social development of South Africa. Zenex Oil (PTY) LTD has subsequently become part of Engen Petroleum LTD.  Sasol LTD and TEPCO Petroleum (PTY) LTD joined the organisation in 2000. Mossgas (PTY) LTD was replaced by PetroSA (PTY) LTD in 2002.  

SAPIA is managed by a board with representation from each of the member companies. The organisation's headquarters is situated in Johannesburg with Mr. A (Avhaphani) Tshifularo as its current executive director.

The organisation's website provides information as to how fuel prices in South Africa are determined (many liquid fuels in South Africa are subject to price controls). The site also has information on the demand for liquid fuel in South Africa.

SAPIA was in the news early in 1995 during the arguments about the protection that Sasol (then not yet a member) received from government. In protest, SAPIA withdrew from the National Economic Development & Labour Council (NEDLAC) initiative's liquid fuels task team and was strongly criticized for this move, especially by Cosatu.

References
ANC newsletter from 2003 - with an article discussing SAPIA's role in the drafting of South Africa's Liquid Fuels Charter

External links

Oil and gas companies of South Africa
Organizations established in 1994
1994 establishments in South Africa
Energy business associations